The 2017 Louth Senior Football Championship was the 124th edition of the Louth GAA's premier club Gaelic football tournament for senior graded teams in County Louth, Ireland. The tournament consisted of 12 teams, with the winner going on to represent Louth in the Leinster Senior Club Football Championship. The championship started with a group stage and then progressed to a knock out stage.

Seán O'Mahonys were the defending champions after they defeated the St. Mary's Ardee in the previous years final.

This was St. Joseph's return to the senior grade after claiming the 2016 Louth Intermediate Football Championship title. This ended their 8-year absence from the senior grade after they were relegated to the I.F.C. in 2008.

The draw for the group stages of the championship were made on 9 March 2018.

Team changes 

The following teams changed division since the 2016 championship season.

To S.F.C. 
Promoted from 2016 Louth Intermediate Football Championship
 St. Joseph's Dromiskin – (Intermediate Champions)

From S.F.C. 
Relegated to 2017 Louth Intermediate Football Championship
 O'Connells

Group stage 
There are 4 groups called Group A, B, C and D. The top two finishers in each group will qualify for the quarter-finals. The bottom finishers of each group will qualify for the Relegation Play Off.
The draw for the group stages of the championship were made on 9 March 2017.

Group A 

Round 1
 St. Mary's Ardee 0-15, 0-15 St. Joseph's, Castlebellingham, 8/7/2017,

Round 2
 Seán O'Mahonys 1-7, 0-9 St. Mary's Ardee, Dunleer, 15/7/2017,

Round 3
 Seán O'Mahonys 1-7, 0-9 St. Joseph's, Knockbridge, 22/7/2017,

Quarter-Final Play-off
 St. Joseph's 0-17, 0-14 St. Mary's Ardee, Dunleer, 12/8/2017,

Group B 

Round 1
 Newtown Blues 4-11, 3-10 Kilkerley Emmets, Castlebellingham, 8/7/2017,

Round 2
 Newtown Blues 0-14, 0-10 Dreadnots, Drogheda Park, 14/7/2017,

Round 3
 Dreadnots 2-20, 0-10 Kilkerley Emmets, Stabannon, 22/7/2017,

Group C 

Round 1
 Dundalk Gaels 0-10, 1-6 Cooley Kickhams, Dowdallshill, 9/7/2017,

Round 2
 Naomh Máirtín 4-15, 2-15 Dundalk Gaels, Castlebellingham, 15/7/2017,

Round 3
 Naomh Máirtín 2-15, 1-12 Cooley Kickhams, Castlebellingham, 23/7/2017,

Group D 

Round 1
 Geraldines 1-14, 0-14 St. Patrick's Lordship, Dowdallshill, 9/7/2017,

Round 2
 Geraldines 0-23, 1-10 O'Raghallaighs, Castlebellingham, 15/7/2017,

Round 3
 St. Patrick's Lordship 2-14, 2-7 O'Raghallaighs, Castlebellingham, 23/7/2017,

Knock-out Stages

Relegation Play Off 
The four bottom finishers from each group qualify for the relegation play off. The team to lose both matches will be relegated to the 2018 Intermediate Championship.

Finals 
The winners and runners up of each group qualify for the quarter finals.

Quarter-finals

Semi-finals

Final

Leinster Senior Club Football Championship

References 

Louth Senior Football Championship
Louth Senior Football Championship